Pterophorus uzungwe is a moth of the family Pterophoridae. It is known from Tanzania.

The wingspan is 18–19 mm. Adults have been recorded in August.

Etymology
The species is named after the type locality.

References

Endemic fauna of Tanzania
uzungwe
Insects of Tanzania
Moths of Africa
Moths described in 1991